Issam is an Arabic name. People with the name include:

 Issam (born 1993), Moroccan rapper 
 Issam Alnajjar (born 2003), Jordanian musician and actor
 Issam Chebake (born 1989), Moroccan footballer 
 Issam Fares (born 1937), Lebanese businessman and politician
 Issam Hajali, Lebanese musician
 Issam Abu Jamra (born 1937), Lebanese military officer and politician
 Issam Jebali (born 1991), Tunisian footballer 
 Issam Jellali (born 1981), Tunisian tennis player
 Issam Zahreddine (1961–2017), Syrian military officer

Arabic words and phrases
Arabic masculine given names